Secret Messages is the tenth studio album by Electric Light Orchestra (ELO), released in 1983 on Jet Records. It was the last ELO album with bass guitarist Kelly Groucutt, conductor Louis Clark and a full orchestra, and the last ELO album to be released on the Jet label. It was also the final ELO studio album to become a worldwide top 40 hit upon release.

Original concept
Secret Messages, as its title suggests, is littered with hidden messages in the form of backmasking, some obvious and others less so. This was Jeff Lynne's second tongue-in-cheek response to allegations of hidden Satanic messages in earlier Electric Light Orchestra LPs by Christian fundamentalists, which led to American congressional hearings in the early 1980s (a similar response had been made by Lynne on the Face the Music album, during the intro to the "Fire on High" track).

Louis Clark returned to conduct the strings once more and the violinist Mik Kaminski appeared on an ELO recording for the first time since Out of the Blue in 1977, playing a violin solo on the track "Rock 'n' Roll Is King". On completion of this album, Lynne dismissed bass guitarist Groucutt after he sued for alleged lost royalties and later received a settlement out of court.

Artwork
The cover was designed by David Costa created by the photographer Hag and hand tinted by Kim Harris. It was the original from which Hag created "The Future's a Bit Fishy. We've Got a Hand in It." The cover's foreground contains figures from various classical paintings. In the building on the right of the cover, the band is featured in the second story windows.

In Britain, the back cover of Secret Messages has the mock notice "Warning: Contains Secret Backward Messages". Word of the album's impending release in the United States caused enough of a furore to cause CBS Records to delete the cover blurb there.

The back cover of the record jacket (made to look like the back of a picture frame) also contains "Secret Messages" in the form of three aged and weathered stickers.  One is the track listing and the other two contain mock names of the retailer and manufacturer of the frame.  These names are anagrams of the 4 band members:  T.D. Ryan (R. Tandy), F.Y.J. Fennel (Jeff Lynne), G.U. Ruttock (K. Groucutt) and E.V. Nabbe (Bev Bevan).  The inner record sleeve also contains a "Secret Message".  The front and back has a string of dots and dashes that is actually Morse Code and repeats "E L O":  E (one dot), L (dot dash dot dot) and O (dash dash dash).

Release
The record was originally going to be a double album, but this plan was thwarted by Jet's distributor, CBS Records, claiming that producing a double vinyl album would be too expensive; as a result, leader Jeff Lynne would have to reduce it to a single album. This version of the album was digitally recorded and would have been ELO's first compact disc.

Three singles were released from the album in the UK: "Rock 'n' Roll Is King", the title track and "Four Little Diamonds". In the US, "Rock 'n' Roll Is King", "Four Little Diamonds" and "Stranger" were issued. "Rock 'n' Roll Is King" became the band's last UK Top 20 hit. The song "Letter from Spain" was used as backing music in commercials for the Games of the XXV Olympiad, held in 1992 in Barcelona.

The songs "After All" and "Buildings Have Eyes" from the original intended double album concept were released as b-sides to "Rock 'n' Roll Is King" and "Secret Messages" respectively. The song "Endless Lies" was later re-recorded with a different pre-chorus for the band’s subsequently-released Balance of Power album. Three additional songs, "Hello My Old Friend", a string-laden eight-minute long tribute to the band's home town Birmingham, "Mandalay" and "No Way Out" (along with aforementioned "Buildings Have Eyes") appeared on the Afterglow box set released in 1990.

In 2001 Secret Messages was remastered and reissued on CD with bonus tracks including the previously unreleased original 1983 version of "Endless Lies".

A 35th anniversary edition was released by Legacy Recordings on double LP and via streaming services on 3 August 2018. It closely matched the format and length originally conceived by Jeff Lynne for the 1983 release though one track remains unreleased ("Beatles Forever"). Other alterations from the original 1983 release include the album's outro being moved from the end of "Rock 'n' Roll Is King" to "Hello My Old Friend" and an edit of "Rock 'n' Roll Is King" B-side "After All". Updated liner notes read:

Track listing
All songs written by Jeff Lynne; strings conducted by Louis Clark.

Original LP track listing

CD track listing

A ^ "Time After Time" was originally included on cassette tape format and on CD. Available on the vinyl format on the "Rock 'n' Roll Is King" maxi single and the Japan Digital Master of the album.

2018 double album track listing

Personnel

ELO
Jeff Lynne – Lead and backing vocals, guitars, synthesisers, bass guitar, piano, percussion, Oberheim DMX, producer
Bev Bevan – Drums, percussion
Richard Tandy – Synthesizers, grand piano, electric piano, harmonica, Oberheim DMX
Kelly Groucutt – Bass guitar, backing vocals ("Train of Gold", "Rock 'n' Roll Is King", "No Way Out" and "Beatles Forever")

Additional personnel
Mik Kaminski – electric violin ("Rock 'n' Roll Is King")
 Dave Morgan – additional backing vocals
 Bill Bottrell – Engineer
 Strings conducted by Louis Clark ("Train Of Gold", "Danger Ahead", "Stranger", "Buildings Have Eyes", "Time After Time" and "Hello My Old Friend")
Al Quaglieri – Reissue producer (2001)

Charts and certifications

Weekly charts

Year-end charts

Certifications

References

Electric Light Orchestra albums
Albums produced by Jeff Lynne
1983 albums
Epic Records albums
Jet Records albums